Paroxacis interrita is a species of false blister beetle in the family Oedemeridae. It is found in North America.

References

Further reading

 

Oedemeridae
Beetles of North America
Beetles described in 1951
Articles created by Qbugbot